There are two mountains called Tanka Tanka in Bolivia:

 Tanka Tanka (La Paz), in La Paz Department
 Tanka Tanka (Oruro), in Oruro Department